Michael Kolarz (born 12 January 1987) is a Czech professional ice hockey defenceman currently with HC České Budějovice in the Czech Extraliga.

Kolarz previously played for Kingston Frontenacs, HC Havířov, SK Kadaň and MšHK Žilina.

References

External links

1987 births
Living people
Czech ice hockey defencemen
Motor České Budějovice players
HC Havířov players
Kingston Frontenacs players
KooKoo players
MsHK Žilina players
New Mexico Scorpions (CHL) players
People from Havířov
Sportspeople from the Moravian-Silesian Region
Czech expatriate ice hockey players in Canada
Czech expatriate ice hockey players in Slovakia
Czech expatriate ice hockey players in the United States
Czech expatriate ice hockey players in Finland
Czech expatriate ice hockey players in Germany
Czech expatriate sportspeople in Poland
Expatriate ice hockey players in Poland
Czech people of Polish descent
Naturalized citizens of Poland